Lesbian, gay, bisexual, and transgender (LGBT) people in Alagoas, Brazil enjoy many of the same legal protections available to non-LGBT people. Homosexuality is legal in the state.

Recognition of same-sex unions

On January 6, 2012, the Court of Alagoas legalized same-sex marriage throughout the state of Alagoas, being the first to do so. Now, same-sex couples don't need to have judge's approval to have a marriage license.

References

Alagoas
Alagoas